Shout Gladi Gladi is a 2015 American-British documentary film about the obstetric fistula problem in Africa, co-directed by Adam Friedman and Iain Kennedy, narrated by Meryl Streep, and named for the celebration held after women completed treatment.

Background
It is estimated that 2 million women in Africa contract obstetric fistula during labor, and while more than 500,000 die each year during pregnancy or childbirth, 80% of these deaths are avoidable.  The film documents the people who have set a goal to rescue African women from the medical condition which causes affected women to become societal outcasts.  Filmed in Kenya, Malawi and Sierra Leone, the film speaks toward Ann Gloag, a former nurse who pushes the movement to save these women, efforts to help the  patients themselves, and speaks toward heir stories of personal struggle and triumph. The film ends with the Gladi Gladi ceremony, a singing and dancing celebratory event marking the day the women return home cured.

Production
Friedman had first met Ann Gloag in 2008, and after learning of her project, decided to make a film documenting her efforts.  The film was eventually written by Iain Kennedy and co-directed by Kennedy and Adam Friedman, and produced by Friedman's Vertical Ascent in collaboration with The Freedom From Fistula Foundation, an organization founded and run by Scottish businesswoman, Ann Gloag.  The foundation partnered with Opportunity Bank in Malawi to provide the newly-cured with a small solar-panel powered generator called a "BBOXX", to allow the women to earn money by charging fees to charge cell-phones, thus providing them with a business opportunity and allowing them to "become masters of their own destiny."

According to Adam Friedman, "Filming ‘Shout’ was an extraordinary experience. My wife and I were stopped at gunpoint in Malawi and were one of the last film crews shooting in Sierra Leone as the Ebola plague descended. But throughout, the wonderful people of Africa and the amazing work that Ann’s groups were doing inspired us to keep on keeping on.”

Friedman was surprised at Meryl Streep's interest in being a part of the film.  He had originally wished a narrator of her caliber, but did not think it was even possible. Urged by an acquaintance of his sister's, he sent Streep a copy of the film.  One week later he received word from her office that she felt Gladi was so powerful a film she "felt the need to be involved."

Meryl Streep stated "This powerful film attests to the igniting power of one woman, Ann Gloag, to set in motion hundreds of helping hands, doctors, nurses, caregivers, family and friends, to resuscitate the health and status of victims of fistula, and to give them back their lives."

The first cut of the film was completed in September 2015, and according to Friedman, it was only missing the key piece of Meryl Streep.

Cast

 Meryl Streep as Narrator
 Ann Gloag 
 Wole Soyinka 
 Melinda Gates 

Participants:

 Florence Banda 
 Ibrahim Bangura
 Isaac Balla-Bangura 
 Dr. Nina Batchelor 
 Lois Boyle 
 Yayah Conteh 
 Chris Baker-Brian 
 Juliette Bright 
 Sydneylyn Faniyan
 Bernadette Fofanah 
 Elfrida Fomba 
 Nurse Frida 
 Dr. Tagie Gbawuru-Mansaray 
 Hawa Hawatouri 
 Jude Holden Dr. 
 Dr. Stephen Kaliti 
 Adama Kamara
 Isatu Kamara
 Dr. Sarian Kamara 
 Bornor Kargbo
 Stephen Katumo 
 Yata Lahai 
 Vanesia Laiti 
 Margaret Moyo 
 Chief Of Mphendu 
 Lucy Mwangi 
 Ngbai Aminita 
 Carolynne Nkomo 
 Philippa Richards
 Mandetiti Sisi
 Omar Scott
 Dr. Edwin Stephen
 Ami Talibeh
 Dorthe Tate
 Dr. Roland Taylor
 Jeff Wilkinson

Recognition
The Los Angeles Times praised the project, writing "the film can feel like an infomercial for the foundation, but that doesn't stop the power of the stories from coming through."

The New York Times noted the film did not shy away from disturbing imagery and also praised the film, writing "If your job is to make a depressing movie about a particularly unpleasant medical condition, poverty and ruined lives, maybe you should look for a celebrity narrator. The filmmakers behind “Shout Gladi Gladi,” set in Sierra Leone and Malawi, found Meryl Streep, and her sympathy-rich voice does temper the horror and add glamour."

The Hollywood Reporter wrote that the film was an "inessential doc about a charity doing badly needed work," but praised Ann Gloag and Adam Friedman for their bringing attention to medical shortcomings in Africa. They wrote "It's tough work making a feel-good doc about obstetric fistula, a horrific condition afflicting millions of women and girls in Africa, but the celebratory title of Shout Gladi Gladi signals that Adam Friedman intends to do just that," and concluded "The film is most intellectually stimulating when it ventures outside her group, to get big-picture commentary on public-health charities from Melinda Gates and Nobel laureate Wole Soyinka."

Film Journal International also praised the filmmakers, writing, "Fistula is the subject of this supremely compassionate documentary—not an easy subject, but the filmmakers should be saluted for tackling it in such an intelligent and thorough manner."

References

External links
 Shout Gladi Gladi at the Internet Movie Database
 Shout Gladi Gladi at Rotten Tomatoes
 
 
 

2015 documentary films
2015 films
Films shot in Malawi
American documentary films
Medical-themed films
British documentary films
American independent films
Films shot in Sierra Leone
Films shot in Kenya
British independent films
2015 independent films
2010s English-language films
2010s American films
2010s British films